Jacques Bizard Bridge is a bridge that crosses the Rivière des Prairies and connects L'Île Bizard to Montreal Island. Except for a cable ferry that connects Île Bizard with Laval-sur-le-Lac, it is the only access to Île Bizard, which had a population of 13,861 at the 2001 census. It carries three lanes of Jacques Bizard Boulevard, including one reversible lane. As of 2008, it is being widened to accommodate a bicycle path. The ferry, which crosses the north branch of the Rivière des Prairies, operates only seasonally between April and November.

The bridge was named after Jacques Bizard, who was seigneur of Île Bonaventure, which was later renamed after him as well. The current span was built in 1966 and replaced an old bridge that was built in 1893.

See also
 List of bridges spanning the Rivière des Prairies
 List of crossings of the Rivière des Prairies
 List of bridges in Montreal

Bizard
L'Île-Bizard–Sainte-Geneviève
Road bridges in Quebec
1966 establishments in Quebec
Bridges completed in 1966